Chub is an unincorporated community in Midland County, Texas, in the United States.

History
Chub was likely founded in the 1880s when the Texas and Pacific Railway was extended to that point.

References

Unincorporated communities in Midland County, Texas
Unincorporated communities in Texas